Edla Spencer-Churchill, Duchess of Marlborough (née Griffiths; born 1968), is a British ceramist and aristocrat. She is the second wife of Jamie Spencer-Churchill, 12th Duke of Marlborough.

Early life and career 
The Duchess of Marlborough was born in Abergavenny, Monmouthshire, Wales, the daughter of Pauline E (née Jones) and Alun Griffiths. Her father owns Alun Griffiths Contractors, a civil engineering company in Abergavenny.

She studied ceramics at Camberwell College of Art, illustration at St. Martin's and ceramics at the Royal College of Art. She specialises in the creation of unique but functional hand-built ceramics based on ideas from her environment, such as foliage, birds, and interiors, blended with themes gleaned from museums, exhibitions, and travel. As Edla Griffiths, she has exhibited at the Victoria and Albert Museum and the Crafts Council.

Personal life 
Edla Griffiths married James Spencer-Churchill, 12th Duke of Marlborough, on 1 March 2002 at the Woodstock Register Office in Oxfordshire. The couple have two children:
 Lady Araminta Clementine Megan Spencer-Churchill (born 8 April 2007)
 Lord Caspar Sasha Ivor Spencer-Churchill (born 18 October 2008)

From his previous marriage to Rebecca Few-Brown, the Duke has a son, George, who is heir apparent to the Dukedom of Marlborough.

References

1968 births
British ceramicists
British women ceramicists
Dukes of Marlborough
Marlborough
Living people